The 2013 Sioux Falls Storm season was the team's fourteenth season as a professional indoor football franchise and fifth in the Indoor Football League (IFL). One of just nine teams competing in the IFL for the 2013 season, the Sioux Falls Storm were members of the United Conference.

Led by head coach Kurtiss Riggs, the Storm played their home games at the Sioux Falls Arena in Sioux Falls, South Dakota. Sioux Falls entered the 2013 season following consecutive wins in the league's "United Bowl" championship game in 2011 and 2012.

After early season struggles, 36-year-old former MVP quarterback Terrance Bryant returned under center. Bryant had quarterbacked the team to their United Indoor Football titles from 2005-2008 and had his number 5 retired. Bryant returned as number 15. The Storm finished the regular season 10-4 and earned home field throughout the playoffs. Sioux Falls defeated Cedar Rapids 44-20 in the United Conference Championship to return to the United Bowl. The Storm won a back-and-forth United Bowl over Nebraska 43-40, capturing their third straight IFL title and seventh overall indoor football title. Bryant was named MVP of the United Bowl after throwing four touchdowns in the championship.

Off-field moves
Shortly before the 2013 season began, the owner of the Cheyenne Warriors died which forced that team to suspend operations and the IFL to revise its schedule to accommodate the now 9-team league.

Schedule
Key:

Regular season

Post-season

Roster

Standings

References

External links
Sioux Falls Storm official statistics
2013 IFL regular season schedule

Sioux Falls Storm
Sioux Falls Storm
Sioux Falls Storm
United Bowl champion seasons